The End of the Beginning is a studio album by American rapper Murs. It was released on Definitive Jux in 2002.

Critical reception

John Bush of AllMusic described The End of the Beginning as "one of the most refreshing rap records in years." Nathan Rabin of The A.V. Club called it a "stellar label debut".

In XLR8R, Philip Sherburne praised "Murs' lyricism, which combines an unhurried, conversational flow with a confidence so solid he needn't resort to boasting". Louis Miller of CMJ New Music Report said, "While delivering bold statements against wannabe gangstas and shaking his head at record industry politics, Murs manages to marry street-life thug-appeal with intelligent lyricism and spitfire delivery, attempting to bring The End to corporate Hip-Hop."

Track listing

Charts

References

External links
 

2003 albums
Murs (rapper) albums
Definitive Jux albums
Albums produced by Oh No (musician)
Albums produced by Blockhead (music producer)
Albums produced by El-P
Albums produced by RJD2
Albums produced by Ant (producer)